R1, R.I., R01 or R-1 may refer to:

Military equipment
 R-1 tank, a Romanian tank from World War II
 R-1 (missile), a post World War II Russian rocket
 AEG R.I, a 1918 German super-heavy bomber design
 DFW R.I, a 1916 German prototype bomber aircraft
 HMS Caprice, a destroyer originally designated with Pennant Number R01
 Linke-Hofmann R.I, a World War I German prototype bomber aircraft
 Polikarpov R-1, a Soviet Union copy of the 1931 British Airco DH.9A light bomber aircraft
 USS R-1 (SS-78), a 1918 United States Navy R-class coastal and harbor defense submarine
 a South African made version of the FN FAL battle rifle
 a version of the 1942 German Rheintochter ground-to-air missile
 Sentinel R1, a British airborne radar platform
 a Romanian designation of the Czechoslovak-designed tankette AH-IV

Transportation

Automobiles
 Jaguar R1, a British 1999 Formula One racing car
 Javan R1, a British sports car
 Nuro R1, an American autonomous van
 Ora R1, a Chinese electric city car
 Praga R1, a Czech sports car
 Rivian, R1S and R1T, an American electric mid-size SUV and pickup truck
 SIN R1, a Bulgarian sports car
 Subaru R1, a Japanese city car

Aviation
 Beriev R-1, a 1952 Soviet turbojet-powered flying boat
 International Air Transport Association code for Sirin (airline)

Motorcycles
 Yamaha YZF-R1, a motorcycle

Rail

Lines
 R1 (New York City Subway car)
 R1 (SEPTA), a former commuter rail line in Philadelphia, Pennsylvania, which was split into:
 Airport Line (SEPTA), or R1 Airport line
 SEPTA Main Line (R1 Glenside) Also called the Glenside Combined
 R1–RG1 (Rodalies de Catalunya), a commuter rail line in Catalonia, Spain

Individual locomotive classes
 LCDR R1 class, a class of 0-4-4T steam locomotives built by the South Eastern and Chatham Railway to modified LCDR design in 1900
 PRR R1, a 1934 American single prototype electric locomotive
 SECR R1 class, a class of 0-6-0T steam locomotives rebuilt by the South Eastern and Chatham Railway from the SER R class between 1910 and 1922
 LNER Class R1, a class of British steam locomotives

Roads
 R1 expressway (Czech Republic), an expressway in the Czech Republic
 R1 expressway (Slovakia), a road connecting Trnava and Banská Bystrica
 R1 ring road (Belgium), a ring road around Antwerp
 R-1 motorway (Spain), a future radial motorway connecting Madrid and El Molar
 Radial Road 1 or R-1, an arterial road of Manila, Philippines

Computing
 R1 (expert system), a 1978 expert system written by John McDermott
 .r01, a RAR file extension
 an alternate name for the Rice Institute Computer, an innovative computer extant at Rice University from 1959 to 1971

Biology
 R1 plasmid, a plasmid found in E Coli
 ATC code R01 Nasal preparations, a subgroup of the Anatomical Therapeutic Chemical Classification System
 Haplogroup R1 (Y-DNA), a human Y-chromosome DNA haplogroup
 The R1 vein in insect wings

Other
 R01 grant, a form of competitive funding issued by the National Institutes of Health in the United States
 R1: Explosive when dry, a risk phrase
 R-1 Federation
 Rogue One, a 2016 film
 R1 Multi-frequency signaling, a telephony control technique
 R1 (nuclear reactor), the first nuclear reactor of Sweden
 R1 space in topology, in mathematics
 R-1 visa, a non-immigrant visa which allows travel to United States for service as a minister or other religious occupation.
 DSC-R1, a 2005 Sony Cyber-shot R series camera
 TV R1, Czech regional television station
 R1, a brand sold by Imperial Tobacco
 Region 1, the DVD region code for United States, Canada, Bermuda, U.S. territories
 Research I university, a designation of U.S. universities engaged in the highest levels of research activity
 BBC Radio 1, a national radio station in the United Kingdom
 Radio One (New Zealand) a New Zealand student radio station
 Samsung YP-R1, a digital audio player